Robert Rudolph Remus (born August 27, 1948), best known by his ring name Sgt. Slaughter, is an American voice actor and retired professional wrestler who is currently signed to WWE in the ambassador program.

From the late 1970s to the early 1980s, Slaughter had success in the National Wrestling Alliance, American Wrestling Association, and the World Wrestling Federation. He won the WWF World Heavyweight Championship and headlined WrestleMania VII in 1991. Slaughter also captured the NWA United States Heavyweight Championship twice. He is a WWE Hall of Famer, inducted as part of the class of 2004. As Sgt. Slaughter, Remus became known for his dark sunglasses, his campaign hat, and his Vietnam War-era military fatigues. In the 1980s, an alternate version of the Sgt. Slaughter character was incorporated into the G.I. Joe: A Real American Hero toy line as well as its animated series and comic books.

The gimmick of Sgt. Slaughter is that of a former U.S. Marine who fought in the Vietnam War. Remus himself never served in the military, received several draft deferments and in fact opposed the war, often protesting and demonstrating as part of the antiwar movement. This has caused controversy because, at times, Remus has talked about military service while seeming to be speaking as himself, and not in character. This has led to accusations of cowardice and stolen valor.

Early life
Remus was born in Detroit, Michigan, and grew up in Minneapolis, Minnesota. He attended Eden Prairie High School in nearby Eden Prairie, where he wrestled and played football.

Professional wrestling career

NWA and AWA (1972–1980)
Sgt. Slaughter held numerous regional titles early in his career and experienced his second major success in the National Wrestling Alliance (NWA) capturing the NWA World Tag Team Championship with Don Kernodle in 1982. During the late 1970s, Remus worked the American Wrestling Association (AWA) territory under a mask as Super Destroyer Mark II with manager Lord Alfred Hayes, whom he dismissed and replaced with Bobby Heenan, leading to a feud between the two managers with Hayes as the babyface.

World Wrestling Federation (1980–1981)

He then signed with the WWF and was pushed as a villainous character. Between 1980 and 1981, Slaughter wrestled in the WWF under the guidance of the Grand Wizard. He very quickly rose to the status of number one contender on the strength of his "cobra clutch" challenges where he would seat wrestlers in a chair in the ring, and apply the hold, offering $5,000 to anyone who could break it. He would eventually face Bob Backlund for the World Wrestling Federation Heavyweight Championship across the WWF territory in 1980, earning two-or-three main event matches in most markets. Slaughter was the only WWF-based challenger not to do the honors for Backlund at MSG (Backlund defeated him at the Meadowlands, but never in the Garden). Slaughter then engaged in a feud with Pat Patterson, which stemmed from Slaughter calling Patterson "yellow" and offering him $10,000 (double the usual amount) to try to break the cobra clutch. Patterson accepted on television and was escaping from the hold when Slaughter released it and put a beat-down on Patterson, starting a hot feud which culminated in an "Alley Fight" in New York, New York's Madison Square Garden between the two that is widely regarded as the best "hardcore" match of the Kayfabe era.

National Wrestling Alliance (1981–1983)
In September 1981, Slaughter joined the National Wrestling Alliance, mainly wrestling for its flagship territory Jim Crockett Promotions. In October 1981, he took part in a tournament to determine a new NWA United States Heavyweight Champion; he defeated Johnny Weaver, Jay Youngblood, and Rick Steamboat in the tournament to win the vacant title. He would hold onto the title for over seven months, before losing the title to Wahoo McDaniel in May 1982.

In September 1982, Slaughter and partner Don Kernodle were awarded the NWA World Tag Team Championship, claiming a title victory over Antonio Inoki and Giant Baba in Tokyo. They would be in a heated rivalry with the team of Rick Steamboat and Jay Youngblood, which culminated on March 12, 1983, losing the titles to Steamboat and Youngblood in a steel cage match in Greensboro, North Carolina. After the rivalry ended, Slaughter left JCP.

During this period, Slaughter also toured Germany and Austria for the Catch Wrestling Association, twice (in 1982 and 1983) unsuccessfully challenging CWA World Heavyweight Champion Otto Wanz.

First return to the WWF (1983–1984)
Slaughter returned to the WWF in March 1983, and again took on the Grand Wizard as his manager. He immediately targeted Backlund, who was still the reigning WWF World Heavyweight Champion. Slaughter turned up the feud another notch when he attacked Backlund at a television taping; Backlund was in the process of completing the Harvard step test before Slaughter beat him repeatedly with his riding crop, leaving bruises on his back. Although he won several matches by disqualification, Slaughter was never able to win the title from Backlund.

In early 1984, Slaughter's career took off after he turned face and defended America's honor against the hated Iron Sheik. Slaughter and the Iron Sheik engaged in many matches throughout the year, culminating in a boot camp match that took place before a sold-out Madison Square Garden that summer. However, with the emergence of Hulk Hogan as the WWF World Heavyweight Champion and lead face within the company, Slaughter left for the AWA. On Vince McMahon's McMahon DVD, Slaughter said he was fired by McMahon in Toronto after no-showing an event in protest of McMahon's refusal to give him six weeks of paid vacation. Other interviews with Slaughter and McMahon have revealed that Slaughter left the company more over a dispute that emerged due to the WWF not allowing Slaughter's role in the G.I. Joe toy line. At the time of his departure Slaughter was easily the second biggest "face" in the company, surpassing Jimmy Snuka, and even André the Giant, with his popularity rivaling that of Hulk Hogan's. Sports editor and columnist Lew Freedman wrote of Slaughter's popularity in the wake of his face turn in August 1985: "Talk about your overnight sensations. Slaughter had been wrestling for 10 years and suddenly he was hotter than Dwight Gooden".

American Wrestling Association (1985–1990)
He received a considerable push in the American Wrestling Association (AWA) throughout 1985 and 1986, becoming the AWA America's Heavyweight Champion, defeating Larry Zbyszko shortly after his arrival. He defended the title against wrestlers like Zbyszko, Kamala, Boris Zukhov, and Nick Bockwinkel (before the belt was retired) and feuded with Sheik Adnan Al-Kaissey and his stable of wrestlers, The Road Warriors, and Colonel DeBeers. He even challenged Stan Hansen for the AWA title. He was also involved in the short-lived Pro Wrestling USA Promotion. This was a brief attempt at pulling together the remaining wrestling talent to go up against the rising WWF. Slaughter in this company won a large 25-man battle royal by eliminating Kamala, winning the right to challenge Ric Flair for the NWA World Heavyweight Championship.

In 1988, Slaughter returned to wrestling in the AWA, resuming some of his past feuds with the likes of Sheik Adnan Al-Kaissey, the Iron Sheik, and Col. DeBeers. He also became a top contender to the AWA World title during Larry Zbyszko's reign in 1989 and was a team captain for the AWA's ill-fated Team Challenge Series during the first half of 1990. The AWA even teased fans with Slaughter appearing to win the World title from Zbyszko live on ESPN, only to have the decision reversed on a technicality (a booking practice the AWA had been employing for years).

Second return to the WWF

Iraqi sympathizer (1990–1991)

After WrestleMania VI, Slaughter sent a letter to Vince McMahon saying he loved the program and was interested in returning. McMahon told Slaughter he wanted a heel, and his new gimmick would be that Slaughter turned on the United States due to its acceptance of the Russian Nikolai Volkoff. According to Slaughter, he found it difficult to do the anti-American promos associated with this gimmick.

The August 1990 invasion of Kuwait by Ba'athist Iraq triggered a political crisis that would lead to the 1991 Gulf War, in which Kuwait was freed by a U.S.-led military coalition. A decision was made to have Slaughter support the Iraqi cause, not for the actual political reasons, but more for the fact that Slaughter liked "brutality" and the Iraqi government was "brutal" while the US regime was said by Slaughter to have become "soft" and "weak". Slaughter aligned himself with an Iraqi enthusiast and kayfabe Iraqi military general, General Adnan (his old rival who left the AWA shortly after Slaughter did), and entered a feud with Volkoff (which saw Slaughter win the majority of their encounters at house shows), leading to a match at that year's Survivor Series which saw The Alliance (Volkoff, Tito Santana, and The Bushwhackers) defeat The Mercenaries (Slaughter, Boris Zhukov, and The Orient Express). As part of his character change, Slaughter began wearing Arab headdresses to the ring, adopted the Camel Clutch as one of his finishers, and was (kayfabe) photographed meeting with Saddam Hussein. Slaughter also infamously adopted a move where he would grind the tip of one of his knuckles into his opponent's temple. It was reported that while Slaughter was portraying a turncoat, he had received numerous death threats and could not go anywhere in public without wearing a bullet-proof vest and had to be surrounded with security personnel at all times. According to Slaughter, Vince asked him to burn the American flag, but Slaughter refused to do that, so Slaughter suggested he burn Hulk Hogan's shirt.

As 1990 ended, Slaughter began challenging for the WWF Championship that had been held by The Ultimate Warrior since WrestleMania VI. Slaughter got his chance at the Royal Rumble in January 1991, days after the Gulf War air campaign had begun. He defeated the Warrior when "Macho King" Randy Savage, who had also been feuding with the Warrior at the time, struck the champion in the head with his royal scepter. Slaughter thus became the thirteenth WWF Champion and was immediately challenged by Royal Rumble winner Hulk Hogan, who was furious that Slaughter had (kayfabe) desecrated the American flag (off-screen) as part of his victory celebration. Hogan demanded a match against Slaughter at WrestleMania VII in Los Angeles, California, and Slaughter accepted. Slaughter lost the WWF Championship to Hogan at WrestleMania. After WrestleMania, Slaughter introduced his newest ally, Colonel Mustafa (The Iron Sheik, Slaughter's old nemesis). Slaughter and company went on to feud with Hogan for months, including having a three-on-two handicap match at SummerSlam, which saw the team of Hulk Hogan and the Ultimate Warrior prevail over Slaughter, Adnan, and Mustafa.

Various feuds (1991–1994)
After finishing the Hogan feud, Slaughter became a face again, appearing in vignettes next to American landmarks, saying, "I want my country back". During an episode of Superstars, Jim Duggan was under attack from The Nasty Boys, and Slaughter made the save. Duggan and Slaughter teamed up to defeat the Nasty Boys and continued to team over the next several months. Slaughter would also feud with General Adnan and Col. Mustafa, winning every match in his feud with the heel duo. Slaughter was taken off TV in June 1992 and worked in house shows against The Mountie until August of that year. Slaughter's last regular WWF match, which was against Nailz, was in October 1992 and ended in no contest when Nailz viciously attacked Slaughter before the match could begin.

Slaughter started appearing as an on-air official from October 1992 to June 1994. He made his first wrestling appearance in over a year when he appeared on a house show version of a Royal Rumble that was held on January 17, 1994, at Madison Square Garden. After helping to eliminate Adam Bomb he, in turn, was tossed out by Crush. Later that year he would wrestle on four house shows in July in New Jersey and Pennsylvania, facing and defeating Quebecer Pierre. He left the company in September.

Third return to the WWF

WWF Commissioner and sporadic appearances (1997–2009)
After a hiatus, he returned to WWF television on the August 4, 1997, episode of Raw Is War to assume the role of on-air commissioner by (kayfabe) President Gorilla Monsoon who in reality retired from being on camera due to health issues. Initially popular, he eventually became the target of D-Generation X, who called him "Sgt. Slobber". On an episode of Raw Is War, he put Shawn Michaels and Triple H in a match for Michaels' European Championship. Michaels dropped the belt to Helmsley by lying down in the ring. Slaughter challenged Triple H to a Boot Camp match at the December pay-per-view, which he lost. His feud with Triple H continued into WrestleMania XIV where he handcuffed himself to Chyna to prevent her from interfering with Helmsley's match against Owen Hart. But Slaughter's efforts ultimately proved futile, as Chyna threw powder into his eyes, interfered with the match anyway, and hurled Slaughter into the front row.

In 1998, Slaughter turned heel, joined Vince McMahon along with Gerald Brisco and Pat Patterson, and became the on-screen lackeys of McMahon; running errands for him and dishing out punishment to McMahon's rivals, namely Steve Austin. In late 1998, Slaughter relinquished the role of commissioner to Shawn Michaels and largely disappeared from television.

Slaughter still appeared from time to time in the ring, mostly at house shows. He appeared on Raw to put over younger wrestlers, such as Kurt Angle and Funaki. Slaughter also made an appearance at WrestleMania X-Seven, in the gimmick Battle Royal, which was won by The Iron Sheik. Slaughter got his revenge after the match by locking the Sheik in the cobra clutch. He also appeared on both Raw and SmackDown on occasion during the Invasion storyline in non-wrestling roles, usually in conjunction with Vince McMahon.

On November 24, 2003, he lost to Randy Orton on Raw as Orton became the Legend Killer.

He made a special appearance on June 13, 2005, episode of Raw to challenge Chris Masters in his "Master Lock Challenge", which Slaughter lost. Then, he returned again on December 5 episode of Raw, where he and Michael Hayes confronted Edge. He also appeared on the July 4, 2006 episode of Raw for a "Diva Boot Camp" segment, as a part of the 2006 Diva Search Competition.

He re-appeared on October 2 episode of Raw, defeating Nicky from the Spirit Squad with a roll-up when D-Generation X distracted him from up on the TitanTron. Slaughter appeared on the October 23 Raw in the corner of Ric Flair as he faced Kenny of the Spirit Squad. After Kenny cheated to gain the victory, Slaughter, Dusty Rhodes, and Roddy Piper cleared the tag champions from the ring. Slaughter was one of three options between himself, Roddy Piper, and Dusty Rhodes that fans could vote for as a tag partner for Ric Flair at Cyber Sunday, but did not win the vote. At Survivor Series, Slaughter teamed with Flair, Ron Simmons, and Dusty Rhodes to take on four members of the Spirit Squad in a Survivor Series match. Slaughter was eliminated in the match, but his team won, with Flair as the sole survivor.

On December 18, 2006, Slaughter participated in a 30-man battle royal for a chance to face John Cena in the main event for the WWE Championship, but he was eliminated from the match and did not get the title shot. At the Vengeance: Night of Champions pay-per-view in June 2007, he faced Deuce 'n Domino for the WWE Tag Team Championship, alongside Jimmy Snuka. They were unsuccessful in their attempt for the titles. He challenged Randy Orton on July 30 episode of Raw, only to become another victim of the "Legend Killer" and was wheeled out on a stretcher. On Raw XV, the 15th-anniversary Raw special on December 10, 2007, Slaughter participated in the 15th Anniversary Battle Royal. On March 31, 2008, on an episode of Raw, Slaughter paid tribute to longtime friend Ric Flair at the end of the show. He appeared on Raws 800th episode in Kung Fu Naki's dance-off and also made an appearance in the Slammy Awards.

Slaughter, who had been working as a producer for WWE for the past several years, was released from his backstage producer duties with the company on January 13, 2009.

Independent circuit (1998–2014)
His first appearance on the independent circuit following his 1997 signing with WWF, was for the World Wrestling Alliance (WWA) in a tag team match with George "The Animal" Steele. After that, he would only wrestle for WWF/WWE until making two appearances for the WWA in 2003. He started slowing down starting in 2006, wrestling only a few matches a year. On March 28, 2009, he defeated his former rival Kamala at IWC Night of Legends in Franklin, Pennsylvania.  To finish off his career he had one match in 2013 and two matches in 2014, all tag team encounters. His last two matches were for Northeast Wrestling (NEW), who he had competed for in the past. His last match was with Jeff Starr as they defeated Dalton Castle and Jake Manning on March 29, 2014.

Fourth return to WWE (2009–present)

He was the special guest host on Raw on August 10, 2009, where he made fun of Canadians and saying how the USA is the greatest country in the world. He made an appearance on the Decade of SmackDown on October 2, 2009, where he had an altercation with the Iron Sheik about which country was the greatest, USA or Iran. Slaughter would appear on November 15, 2010's Old School RAW losing to Alberto Del Rio in one minute and 53 seconds. Then on June 27, 2011's Raw edition he lost to Jack Swagger in 68 seconds. On July 3, 2012, Slaughter appeared on Smackdown teaming with Jim Duggan and Santino Marella defeating Drew McIntyre, Huncio and Camacho for the Great American Bash. He later appeared on December 31, 2012, edition of Raw, where he was challenged by then-United States Champion Antonio Cesaro in a match for the WWE United States Championship. He lost the match and failed to capture the title. This would be his final match for WWE. He then made an appearance on Old School RAW, serving as the special guest referee for The Great Khali vs Damien Sandow match after he got the most votes.

Slaughter made an appearance on November 24, 2014, edition of Raw, where he confronted United States Champion Rusev and his valet, Lana, and attempted to force Lana and Rusev to recite the Pledge of Allegiance (with the alternative, per an edict from Daniel Bryan, who was running the show that night, being that he would be forced to defend his title against the entire Raw roster). Rusev refused and had a staredown with Slaughter, who wouldn't back down; however, Jack Swagger and his manager, Zeb Colter, ran down to the ring and fended Rusev off. Swagger, Colter, and Slaughter then finished reciting the Pledge of Allegiance.
Slaughter returned at the Tribute to the Troops show on December 17, 2014 and helped Dean Ambrose beat Bray Wyatt by giving Dean his steel-toe boot to use on Wyatt.

Slaughter made a one-night appearance to WWE for the special Raw Reunion on July 22, 2019, and on January 4, 2021, on the Legends Night special episode of Raw.

Slaughter was in attendance at the February 5, 2020 episode of NXT.

Other media
Slaughter voices an adult version of himself in the animated WWE Network Exclusive show Camp WWE.

Fictionalized versions of Sgt. Slaughter were part of the G.I. Joe: A Real American Hero toyline, animated series and comic books, as a member of the G.I. Joe team and first appeared in the five-part TV episode entitled "Arise, Serpentor, Arise!" Along with the traditional merchandising of WWE superstars, Sgt. Slaughter is one of only a few real people to be produced as a G.I. Joe figure, (NFL football player William "The Refrigerator" Perry, pro-wrestler Roddy Piper, and astronaut Buzz Aldrin are some of the others), and even appeared in G.I. Joe: The Movie.

Slaughter also appeared twice as a special guest on The Super Mario Bros. Super Show!, which starred fellow wrestler Captain Lou Albano. He appeared in the episodes "All Steamed Up" (in "Butch Mario and the Luigi Kid") and "Caught in a Draft" (in "Bad Rap").

During the mid-1980s, Sgt. Slaughter released a full-length LP, Sgt. Slaughter and Camouflage Rocks America. It featured a number of original songs, including "The Cobra Clutch," as well as a cover of Neil Diamond's "America".

A brief cross promotional stint in the late 1980s had Sgt. Slaughter and his "battling battalion" pitted against the Bigfoot Monster Truck in a tug-of-war challenge. It is featured on Blood, Sweat, & Gears USHRA home video. This stunt was recently attempted again with Sgt. Slaughter using fans from the crowd at a Monster Truck show to tug-o-war with Bigfoot.

He was featured in the 1989 video game Sgt. Slaughter's Mat Wars by Mindscape.

In the animated series Code Monkeys, Slaughter appeared as Sgt. Murder. He and Bulk Brogan (Hulk Hogan), "Manly Man" Ricky Ravage (Randy "Macho Man" Savage), and Sergei the Giant (André the Giant) were hired by a video game company to take on their rivals. His brother, Tommy Murder, was killed by "The Black Shadow", who was actually Black Steve, the company's accountant.

He appeared on episode #3.6 of Comedy Central's Tosh.0, when he clotheslined Daniel Tosh and put David Wills (a.k.a. YouTube's "Crying Wrestling Fan") in a Cobra Clutch during Wills' "Web Redemption" segment.

In 2014, Sgt. Slaughter made a cameo appearance in the RadioShack Super Bowl XLVIII commercial "The '80s Called".

He later voiced Dr. Military in the 2013 animated series Teen Titans Go! in a two-part episode called "Teen Titans Vroom!"

Championships and accomplishments
 American Wrestling Association AWA America's Championship (1 time)
 AWA British Empire Heavyweight Championship (1 time)1
 Cauliflower Alley Club Iron Mike Mazurki Award (2011)
 Central States Wrestling NWA Central States Heavyweight Championship (3 times)Georgia Championship WrestlingNWA Georgia Tag Team Championship (1 time) – with Pak SongGeorge Tragos/Lou Thesz Professional Wrestling Hall of FameClass of 2019 (Frank Gotch Award)
 Maple Leaf Wrestling NWA Canadian Heavyweight Championship (Toronto version) (1 time)
 Mid-Atlantic Championship Wrestling NWA United States Heavyweight Championship (2 times)
 NWA World Tag Team Championship (Mid-Atlantic version) (1 time) – with Don Kernodle
 National Wrestling Federation NWF Americas Championship (1 time)
 Northeast Championship Wrestling (Tom Janette) NCW Heavyweight Championship (1 time)
 NWA Tri-State NWA United States Tag Team Championship (Tri-State version) (1 time) – with Buck Robley
 Pro Wrestling Illustrated Most Hated Wrestler of the Year (1991)
 Most Inspirational Wrestler of the Year (1984)
 Ranked No. 36 of the top 500 singles wrestlers in the PWI 500 in 1991
 Ranked No. 34 of the top 500 singles wrestlers of the "PWI Years" in 2003
 Ranked No. 29 of the 100 best tag teams of the "PWI Years" with Don Kernodle in 2003
 Professional Wrestling Hall of Fame Class of 2016
 USA Pro Wrestling USA Pro Heavyweight Championship (1 time)
 World Wrestling Federation/Entertainment WWF Championship (1 time)
 WWE Hall of Fame (Class of 2004)
 Wrestling Observer Newsletter'''''
 Match of the Year (1981) vs. Pat Patterson in an Alley Fight
 Most Unimproved (1985)
 Most Washed Up Wrestler (1985)
 Worst Feud of the Year (1985) vs. Boris Zhukov
 Most Disgusting Promotional Tactic (1991) Iraqi sympathizer angle
 Worst Feud of the Year (1991) vs. Hulk Hogan

Notes

External links

 WWE Hall of Fame profile of Sgt. Slaughter
 
 Bio & Interview from SLAM! Wrestling
 Sgt. Slaughter Debut on YouTube

1948 births
20th-century professional wrestlers
21st-century professional wrestlers
American male professional wrestlers
Fictional commanders
Fictional soldiers
Fictional United States Marine Corps personnel
Living people
Masked wrestlers
NWA/WCW/WWE United States Heavyweight Champions
Professional wrestling authority figures
Professional Wrestling Hall of Fame and Museum
Sportspeople from Beaufort, South Carolina
Sportspeople from Detroit
Sportspeople from Minneapolis
The Heenan Family members
WWE Champions
WWE Hall of Fame inductees
NWA Canadian Heavyweight Champions
WCW World Tag Team Champions